Judo was an African Games event at its inaugural edition in 1965 and has continued to feature prominently at the competition in each of its subsequent editions.

Editions

Medalists

Men's
Super lightweight

Half lightweight

Lightweight

Welterweight

Middleweight

Light heavyweight

Heavyweight

Open

Women's
Super lightweight

Half lightweight

Lightweight

Welterweight

Middleweight

Light heavyweight

Heavyweight

Open

External links
 Judo at the 2007 All-Africa Games (magharebia.com)

 
Sports at the African Games
All-Africa Games
 
African Games